Staunton Township is one of the twelve townships of Miami County, Ohio, United States.  The 2000 census found 1,992 people in the township.

Geography
Located in the central part of the county, it borders the following townships:
Springcreek Township - north
Brown Township - northeast corner
Lostcreek Township - east
Elizabeth Township - southeast
Bethel Township - south
Monroe Township - southwest
Concord Township - west
Washington Township - northwest

Part of the city of Troy, the county seat of Miami County, is located in western Staunton Township.

Name and history
It is the only Staunton Township statewide.

Government
The township is governed by a three-member board of trustees, who are elected in November of odd-numbered years to a four-year term beginning on the following January 1. Two are elected in the year after the presidential election and one is elected in the year before it. There is also an elected township fiscal officer, who serves a four-year term beginning on April 1 of the year after the election, which is held in November of the year before the presidential election. Vacancies in the fiscal officership or on the board of trustees are filled by the remaining trustees.

References

External links
County website

Townships in Miami County, Ohio
Townships in Ohio